The Zanzottera MZ 313 is an Italian aircraft engine, designed for use in ultralight aircraft.

The engine was originally designed and produced by Zanzottera Technologies of Italy, but the design was sold, along with the rest of the company's two-stroke ultralight aircraft engine line to Compact Radial Engines of Surrey, British Columbia, Canada. As of March 2018, the engine was not offered for sale by Compact Radial Engines. Compact Radial Engines was then in turn acquired by Fiate Aviation Co., Ltd. of Hefei, Anhui, China in August 2017. Fiate Aviation did not advertise the engine as available in 2021.

Design and development
The engine is a single-cylinder two-stroke,  displacement, air-cooled, gasoline engine design, with a poly V belt reduction drive with reduction ratios of 2.24 and 2.34. It employs electronic ignition and produces  at 6250 rpm.

Specifications (MZ 313)

See also

References

Compact Radial Engines aircraft engines
Zanzottera aircraft engines
Two-stroke aircraft piston engines
Air-cooled aircraft piston engines
2010s aircraft piston engines